Ait Sebaa Lajrouf is a commune in Sefrou Province, Fès-Meknès, Morocco. At the time of the 2004 census, the commune had a total population of 17,400 people living in 3138 households.

References

Populated places in Sefrou Province
Rural communes of Fès-Meknès